Jean-Paul Blandin is an American baseball coach and former pitcher, who is the current head coach of the Delaware State Hornets.

Playing career
Blandin attended St. Andrew's School in Middletown, Delaware. While at St. Andrew's, Blandin was named an all-state pitcher in 1988. Blandin then enrolled at Wilmington University, to play college baseball for the Wilmington Wildcats baseball team.

Coaching career
Blandin became a graduate assistant at Wilmington in the fall of 1994. In 1998, Blandin served as the pitching coach at the University of San Francisco. Blandin then served as the pitching at Delaware State University in 2000.

Blandin was named the head coach at Delaware State in the fall of 2000. In 2012, Blandin was named the Mid-Eastern Athletic Conference (MEAC) Coach of the Year. On March 19, 2017, Blandin won his 400th game.

Head coaching record

See also
 List of current NCAA Division I baseball coaches

References

External links

Delaware State Hornets bio

Living people
Baseball pitchers
Wilmington Wildcats baseball players
Wilmington Wildcats baseball coaches
San Francisco Dons baseball coaches
Delaware State Hornets baseball coaches
Year of birth missing (living people)